Cill Charthaigh (anglicised as Kilcar) is a Gaeltacht village on the R263 regional road in the south west of County Donegal in Ireland. It is also a townland of 233 acres and a civil parish in the historic barony of Banagh.

Main Street has a Catholic church (known locally as 'the Chapel') at one end and two textile factories at the other end. In between there are several shops and four pubs. The village has the principal tweed hand weaving facility in Donegal, with a shop Studio Donegal selling tweed products. Kilcar is also known for its tradition in knitting.  There is also a producer of seaweed based cosmetic products.

The primary school is about 750 metres from Main Street, and the parish of Kilcar stretches to the 'burn' which separates it from the next village, Carrick, which is about 5 kilometres away.

Located close to the Slieve League cliffs, the town is known for the scenic coastal landscapes and the musical and cultural traditions.

Culture
Áislann Chill Chartha is a community facility which includes a library, sports hall (basketball and indoor football), a fitness suite, computer centre, and small theatre. It also has exhibits based on the history of South West Donegal and exhibitions of historic local photographs. It is located beside Studio Donegal.

St. Cartha's Pipe Band was formed in Kilcar in 1934. The band competed in their first All Ireland Pipe Band Championships in 2009. At the Malahide piping and drumming festival of the same year, the band finished second in their grade. The bands uniform consists of a saffron kilt and green tunic.

About 22% of residents are native Irish speakers.

Sport and outdoor activities

Gaelic football is among the more popular sports in Kilcar, and the GAA pitch at Towney is located 2 kilometres outside the village on the coast road. The local club, CLG Chill Chartha, have been 6 times Donegal Champions.

In the townland of Muckross (Mucros in Irish), which is a location for tourists due to its scenery, rock climbing, surfing beach and family bathing beach.

Curris also has views of Sliabh a Liag, and has a beach and pier in close proximity.

People
 Matthew Broderick and Sarah Jessica Parker own a holiday home in the area, and have been regular visitors.
 Bishop Séamus Hegarty was from Kilcar.
 Patrick McBrearty, Donegal GAA player is from Kilcar.
 Brothers James and Martin McHugh, 1992 All-Ireland Senior Football Champions, are from Kilcar. Martin is the father of Mark, 2012 All-Ireland champion and All Star and his brother Ryan, 2014 All-Ireland Finalist and All Star Award winner.
 The Revs, an indie rock band, come from Kilcar and sometimes play at the annual Kilcar Festival in August.

See also
 List of populated places in the Republic of Ireland
 List of towns and villages in Northern Ireland
 Largy Waterfall

References

External links

Articles on towns and villages in Ireland possibly missing Irish place names
 
Gaeltacht places in County Donegal
Gaeltacht towns and villages
Townlands of County Donegal
Towns and villages in County Donegal